Apiwich Phulek (born February 5, 1988, as Jetsada Phulek), simply known as Lek, is a Thai professional footballer who plays as a winger for Thai League 2 club Suphanburi. He has featured for the Thai Port first team in the 2009 season mainly as a left winger.

Club career

Honours

Club
Thai Port
 Thai FA Cup: 2009

References

External links
 Profile at Goal

1988 births
Living people
Apiwich Phulek
Apiwich Phulek
Association football fullbacks
Apiwich Phulek
Apiwich Phulek
Apiwich Phulek
Apiwich Phulek
Apiwich Phulek
Apiwich Phulek
Apiwich Phulek
Apiwich Phulek